Strategic Highway 1 (S-1), also known as the Gilgit–Skardu Road or Skardu Road, is a  highway in Pakistan that links the cities of Gilgit and Skardu in Gilgit−Baltistan. It was constructed by the Pakistan Army Corps of Engineers and the Association of Chinese Engineers from 1970 to 1982.

Route

The highway begins south of Gilgit on the Karakoram Highway, near Juglot, and extends eastward towards Skardu. The surface was initially gravel, but some sections were later paved. The road is winding and, in some places, only wide enough for one vehicle to pass at a time. On other parts of the highway it is bordered by a cliff drop of hundreds of meters unprotected by guardrails. Total travel time between Gilgit and Skardu is around 4 hours.

The highway can be blocked for weeks at a time depending on conditions (though two to five days is more common). It is one of the most dangerous roads in the world.

Strategic importance
Though very dangerous, the Skardu Road is important for the defence of the country, being a supply route for border regions including Kargil, Siachen, Batalik and Chorbat. Pakistan Army’s soldiers man these border areas round the clock, throughout the year.

The road is also important, because it is the lifeline of the hundreds of thousands of people in the four districts of Baltistan. Supplies from markets in KP and Punjab, as well as from markets in Gilgit city, go to Baltistan through this region. Its prolonged blockade inevitably leads to shortage of basic necessities of life in the region. Thousands of the region’s residents also travel in an out of Baltistan through this strategic yet volatile road.

Improvements and upgrades

Since the early eighties, the road had not been renovated, and was in a very poor condition. Fatal accidents, landslides, rockfalls and floods, were not uncommon along the route. Consequently, a large number of vehicles, with passengers and goods, used to fall off the road into the Indus River flowing down below. Several dozens of people died in accidents every year. The incidence of mishaps increased especially during the rainy season, when the broken and slippery road, coupled with the hydro-meteorological hazards, wreaked havoc, blocking the road every now and then, leaving hundreds of passengers stranded. 

As a result, tourists either preferred travelling to Skardu by air or visited other areas in the north if they were travelling by road.

Successive Pakistani governments had promised to renovate the road since 2009, but work was continuously delayed. It wasn't until 2017 that work finally started on this important project. It cost Rs. 31 billion, and took four years to complete. 

On December 16, 2021, the upgraded road was inaugurated by Prime Minister Imran Khan. The road has now been increased in width from 3.6 meters to 7.3 meters to allow a better and smooth flow of traffic. Moreover, the time it earlier took to reach Skardu from Gilgit was about 10 hours, which will now be reduced to four hours. However, the road project has been completed without tunnels and alignments which were initially part of the upgrade plan designed by the Frontier Works Organisation (FWO). Thus, the uncertainty of closure of the road due to landslides still exists.

See also 
 National Highways of Pakistan

References

External links
 National Highway Authority

 Roads in Gilgit-Baltistan
 Roads in Pakistan